The Men's time trial C2 road cycling event at the 2016 Summer Paralympics took place on 14 September at Flamengo Park, Pontal. Thirteen riders from 13 nations competed.

The C2 category is for cyclists with upper or lower limb impairments and moderate to severe neurological dysfunction.

Results

References

Men's road time trial C2